Bootleg Access consists of  in Washington County, Missouri about  south of Potosi. The access is owned and managed by the Missouri Department of Conservation and provides access to the Big River along Missouri Route 21.

There is a  trail, three parking lots, viewing deck, and three campsites in the area.

References

Protected areas of Washington County, Missouri
Conservation Areas of Missouri